James Harris Simons (born 25 April 1938) is an American mathematician, billionaire hedge fund manager, and philanthropist. He is the founder of Renaissance Technologies, a quantitative hedge fund based in East Setauket, New York. He and his fund are known to be quantitative investors, using mathematical models and algorithms to make investment gains from market inefficiencies. Due to the long-term aggregate investment returns of Renaissance and its Medallion Fund, Simons is described as the "greatest investor on Wall Street," and more specifically "the most successful hedge fund manager of all time."

As reported by Bloomberg Billionaires Index, Simons' net worth is estimated to be $25.2 billion, making him the 66th-richest person in the world.

Simons is known for his studies on pattern recognition. He developed the Chern–Simons form (with Shiing-Shen Chern), and contributed to the development of string theory by providing a theoretical framework to combine geometry and topology with quantum field theory. In 1994, Simons founded the Simons Foundation with his wife to support researches in mathematics and fundamental sciences. He is one of the biggest donors to the University of California, Berkeley, establishing the Simons Institute for the Theory of Computing in 2012, and to Berkeley's Simons Laufer Mathematical Sciences Institute, where he has served as a trustee since 1999.

In 2016, asteroid 6618 Jimsimons, discovered by Clyde Tombaugh in 1936, was named after Simons by the International Astronomical Union in honor of his contributions to mathematics and philanthropy.

Early life and education
James Harris Simons was born on April 25, 1938 to an American Jewish family, the only child of Marcia (née Kantor) and Matthew Simons, and raised in Brookline, Massachusetts.

He received a bachelor's degree in mathematics from the Massachusetts Institute of Technology in 1958 and a PhD in mathematics from the University of California, Berkeley under supervision of Bertram Kostant in 1961 at the age of 23. After graduating from MIT, Simons traveled from Boston to Bogotá, Colombia on a motor scooter.

Academic and scientific career
Simons' mathematical work has primarily focused on the geometry and topology of manifolds. His 1962 Berkeley PhD thesis, written under the direction of Bertram Kostant, gave a new proof of Berger's classification of the holonomy groups of Riemannian manifolds. He subsequently began to work with Shing-Shen Chern on the theory of characteristic classes, eventually discovering the Chern–Simons secondary characteristic classes of 3-manifolds. Later, a mathematical physicist Albert Schwarz discovered early topological quantum field theory, which is an application of the Chern–Simons form. 
It is also related to the Yang-Mills functional on 4-manifolds, and has had an effect on modern physics. These and other contributions to geometry and topology led to Simons becoming the 1976 recipient of the AMS Oswald Veblen Prize in Geometry. In 2014, he was elected to the National Academy of Sciences of the USA.

In 1964, Simons worked with the National Security Agency to break codes. Between 1964 and 1968, he was on the research staff of the Communications Research Division of IDA and taught mathematics at the Massachusetts Institute of Technology and Harvard University. After being forced to leave the IDA due to his public opposition to the Vietnam War, he joined the faculty at Stony Brook University. From 1968 to 1978, he was appointed chairman of the math department at Stony Brook University. Simons was asked by IBM in 1973 to attack the block cipher Lucifer, an early but direct precursor to the Data Encryption Standard (DES). Simons founded Math for America, a nonprofit organization, in January 2004 with a mission to improve mathematics education in United States public schools by recruiting more highly qualified teachers.

Investment career

Renaissance Technologies

For more than two decades, Simons' Renaissance Technologies' hedge funds, which trade in markets around the world, have employed mathematical models to analyze and execute trades, many automated. Renaissance uses computer-based models to predict price changes in financial instruments. These models are based on analyzing as much data as can be gathered, then looking for non-random movements to make predictions.

Medallion, the main fund which is closed to outside investors, has earned over $100 billion in trading profits since its inception in 1988. This translates to a 66.1% average gross annual return or a 39.1% average net annual return between 1988 – 2018.  Renaissance Technologies manages three other funds – Renaissance Institutional Equities Fund (RIEF), Renaissance Institutional Diversified Alpha (RIDA) and Renaissance Institutional Diversified Global Equity Fund – which, as of April 2019, totalled approximately $55 billion in combined assets and were open to outside investors.

Renaissance employs specialists with non-financial backgrounds, including mathematicians, physicists, signal processing experts and statisticians. The firm's latest fund is the Renaissance Institutional Equities Fund (RIEF). RIEF has historically trailed the firm's better-known Medallion fund, a separate fund that contains only the personal money of the firm's executives.

"It's startling to see such a highly successful mathematician achieve success in another field," says Edward Witten, professor of physics at the Institute for Advanced Study in Princeton, New Jersey and considered by many of his peers to be the most accomplished theoretical physicist alive.In 2006, Simons was named Financial Engineer of the Year by the International Association of Financial Engineers. In 2020, he was estimated to have personally earned $2.6 billion, $2.8 billion in 2007, $1.7 billion in 2006, $1.5 billion in 2005 (the largest compensation among hedge fund managers that year), and $670 million in 2004. On October 10, 2009, Simons announced he would retire on January 1, 2010, but remain at Renaissance as nonexecutive chairman.

Wealth and personal life 
In 2014, Simons reportedly earned US$1.2 billion, including a share of his firm's management and performance fees, cash compensation and stock and option awards. According to Forbes magazine, Simons had a net worth of $18 billion in 2017, making him #24 on the Forbes 400 richest people list. In 2018, he was ranked 23rd by Forbes, and in October 2019, his net worth was estimated to be $21.6 billion. In March 2019, he was named one of the highest-earning hedge fund managers and traders by Forbes.

Simons shuns the limelight and rarely gives interviews, citing Benjamin the Donkey in Animal Farm for explanation: "'God gave me a tail to keep off the flies. But I'd rather have had no tail and no flies.'  That's kind of the way I feel about publicity."

In 1996, his son Paul, aged 34, was riding a bicycle, when he was killed by a car on Long Island. In 2003, his son Nicholas, aged 24, drowned on a trip to Bali, Indonesia. His son Nat Simons is an investor and philanthropist and his daughter Liz Simons is an educator and philanthropist.

Simons owns a motor yacht, named Archimedes. It was built at the Dutch yacht builder Royal Van Lent and delivered to Simons in 2008.

Simons doesn't wear socks.

Political and economic views 
Simons is a major contributor to Democratic Party political action committees. According to OpenSecrets, Simons was ranked the #5 donor to federal candidates in the 2016 election cycle, coming behind Renaissance Technologies' co-CEO Robert Mercer, who ranked #1 and generally donates to Republicans. Simons has donated $7 million to Hillary Clinton's Priorities USA Action, $2.6 million to the House and Senate Majority PACs, and $500,000 to EMILY's List. He also donated $25,000 to Republican senator Lindsey Graham's super PAC. Since 2006 Simons has contributed about $30.6 million to federal campaigns. Since 1990, Renaissance Technologies has contributed $59,081,152 to federal campaigns and since 2001, and has spent $3,730,000 on lobbying as of 2016.

In August 2020, Simons donated $1.5 million to the Senate Majority PAC, a Democratic super-PAC.

Controversies
According to The Wall Street Journal in May 2009, Simons was questioned by investors on the dramatic performance gap of Renaissance Technologies' portfolios. The Medallion Fund, which has been available exclusively to current and past employees and their families, surged 80% in 2008 in spite of hefty fees; the Renaissance Institutional Equities Fund (RIEF), owned by outsiders, lost money in both 2008 and 2009; RIEF declined 16% in 2008.

On July 22, 2014, Simons was subject to bipartisan condemnation by the U.S. Senate Permanent Subcommittee on Investigations for the use of complex basket options to shield day-to-day trading (usually subject to higher ordinary income tax rates) as long-term capital gains. "Renaissance Technologies was able to avoid paying more than $6 billion in taxes by disguising its day-to-day stock trades as long term investments," said Sen. John McCain (R., Ariz.), the committee's ranking Republican, in his opening statement.

An article published in The New York Times in 2015 said that Simons was involved in one of the biggest tax battles of the year, with Renaissance Technologies being "under review by the IRS over a loophole that saved their fund an estimated $6.8 billion in taxes over roughly a decade." In September 2021, it was announced that Simons and his colleagues would pay billions of dollars in back taxes, interest and penalties to resolve the dispute, one of the biggest in IRS history.

Philanthropy 
In total, Simons has given over $2.7 billion to philanthropic causes. Simons and his wife, Marilyn Hawrys Simons, co-founded the Simons Foundation in 1994, a charitable organization that supports projects related to education and health, in addition to scientific research. The Simons Foundation established the Simons Foundation Autism Research Initiative (SFARI) in 2003 as a scientific initiative within the Simons Foundation's suite of programs. SFARI's mission is to improve the understanding, diagnosis and treatment of autism spectrum disorders.

In 2004, Simons founded Math for America with an initial pledge of $25 million from the Simons Foundation, a pledge he later doubled in 2006.  The foundation continues to fund its operations, contributing nearly $22 million in 2018.

Simons has been a major benefactor of Berkeley. On July 1, 2012, the Simons Foundation pledged $60 million to Berkeley to establish the Simons Institute for the Theory of Computing, the world's leading institute for collaborative research in theoretical computer science. In 2020, Simons made additional grants to Berkeley totaling over $46 million.  He and his wife also have made major grants to Berkeley affiliates, notably to the Simons Laufer Mathematical Sciences Institute and Berkeley Lab.

The Simons Foundation established the Flatiron Institute in 2016, to house 5 groups of computational scientists (each with 60 or more PhD level researchers). The institute consists of four cores or departments: CCB (Center for Computational Biology), CCA (Center for Computational Astrophysics), CCQ (Center for Computational Quantum mechanics), CCM (Center for Computational Mathematics), and CCN (Center for Computational Neuroscience). The new institute is located in Manhattan and represents a major investment in basic computational science.

Simons and his wife are among MIT's largest contributors.  They have funded the renovation of the building housing the mathematics department, which in 2016 was named in their honor, and endowed the Simons Center for the Social Brain. Simons is a life member emeritus of the MIT Corporation.

In memory of his son Paul, whom he had with his first wife, Barbara Simons, he established Avalon Park, a  nature preserve in Stony Brook. In 1996, 34-year-old Paul was killed by a car driver while riding a bicycle near the Simons home.

Another son, Nick Simons, drowned at age 24 while on a trip to Bali in Indonesia in 2003. Nick had worked in Nepal. The Simons have become large donors to Nepalese healthcare through the Nick Simons Institute.

In 2006, Simons donated $25 million to Stony Brook University through the Stony Brook Foundation, the largest donation ever to a State University of New York school at the time. On February 27, 2008, then Gov. Eliot Spitzer announced a $60 million donation by the Simons Foundation to found the Simons Center for Geometry and Physics at Stony Brook, the largest gift to a public university in New York state history. In 2011, Simons broke that record again with a $150 million donation to Stony Brook, which went to research in medical sciences, the construction of a life sciences building, the creation of a neurosciences institute and a center for biological imaging, the study of cancer and infectious diseases, 35 new endowed professorships and 40 fellowships for graduate students. In order to secure the donation, Stony Brook was allowed to raise its annual tuition in opposition to traditional New York state policy.

Legacy and awards 
In 2008, he was inducted into Institutional Investors Alpha's Hedge Fund Manager Hall of Fame along with Alfred Jones, Bruce Kovner, David Swensen, George Soros, Jack Nash, Julian Roberston, Kenneth Griffin, Leon Levy, Louis Bacon, Michael Steinhardt, Paul Tudor Jones, Seth Klarman and Steven A. Cohen.

He was named by the Financial Times in 2006 as "the world's smartest billionaire". He was elected to the American Philosophical Society in 2007. In 2011, he was included in the 50 Most Influential ranking of Bloomberg Markets Magazine.

A book about Simons and his investing methods, The Man Who Solved the Market: How Jim Simons Launched the Quant Revolution by Gregory Zuckerman was released November 5, 2019. In 2018, Trinity College Dublin awarded him with an honorary doctorate.

Publications and works

See also
Chern–Simons theory
Chern–Simons form
Simons' formula
Simons' theorem
Bernstein's problem
Holonomy
Plateau's problem
List of Massachusetts Institute of Technology alumni
List of University of California, Berkeley alumni
List of people and organizations named in the Paradise Papers

References

Further reading
 D. T. Max, "The Numbers King: Algorithms made Jim Simons a Wall Street billionaire.  His new research center helps scientists mine data for the common good", The New Yorker, 18 & 25 December 2017, pp. 72–76, 78–83.
 Baker, Nathaniel (June 24, 2005). "Renaissance Readies Long-Biased Strat". Institutional Investor.
 Zuckerman, Gregory. The Man Who Solved the Market: How Jim Simon's Launched the Quant Revolution. Portfolio, 2019.

External links

Titan's Millions Stir Up Research Into Autism

"Putting His Money Where His Math Is" – September 2006 article in Seed Magazine.
James Simons on mathematics, common sense and good luck: my life and careers, MIT
Jim Simons Speaks: Just No to Google and Goldman Sachs
James Simons (1-hour interview, May 2015) – Numberphile
Speech at MIT
A rare interview with the mathematician who cracked Wall Street – TED Talk

1938 births
Living people
20th-century American businesspeople
20th-century American mathematicians
21st-century American businesspeople
21st-century American mathematicians
21st-century philanthropists
Academics of Lancaster University
Activists from New York (state)
American billionaires
American chairpersons of corporations
American chief executives of financial services companies
American cryptographers
American financial analysts
American financial company founders
American financiers
American health activists
American hedge fund managers
American investors
American money managers
American political fundraisers
American stock traders
Autism activists
Businesspeople from Massachusetts
Businesspeople from New York City
Differential geometers
Giving Pledgers
Harvard University faculty
Jewish activists
Jewish American philanthropists
Jewish American scientists
Massachusetts Institute of Technology School of Science alumni
Massachusetts Institute of Technology School of Science faculty
Mathematicians from Massachusetts
Mathematicians from New York (state)
Members of the United States National Academy of Sciences
People associated with the Madoff investment scandal
People from Long Island
People from Manhattan
People from Newton, Massachusetts
Philanthropists from New York (state)
Scientists from New York City
Stock and commodity market managers
Trustees of the Institute for Advanced Study
UC Berkeley College of Letters and Science alumni
University of California, Berkeley alumni
People named in the Paradise Papers
21st-century American Jews